The Bahamas Great Exuma Classic is a golf tournament on the Korn Ferry Tour, played at Sandals Emerald Bay Golf Course in the Bahamas. It is one of two Korn Ferry Tour events in the Bahamas, along with The Bahamas Great Abaco Classic. Both events were first played in January 2017 starting on a Sunday and finishing on a Wednesday, rather than the standard Thursday–Sunday schedule.

Due to high winds in the inaugural event, the cut line fell at 11-over-par 155, the highest in Web.com Tour history. The par-4 12th hole played to a stroke average of 5.008, making it the hardest in tour history relative to par.

Winners

Bolded golfers graduated to the PGA Tour via the Korn Ferry Tour regular-season money list.

References

External links

Coverage on the Korn Ferry Tour's official site

Korn Ferry Tour events
Golf tournaments in the Bahamas
Recurring sporting events established in 2017
2017 establishments in the Bahamas